Maaveeran is a 1986 Indian Tamil-language action film directed by Rajasekhar. A remake of the 1985 Hindi film Mard, it stars Rajinikanth, Ambika and Jaishankar. The film revolves around a rude princess, who falls in love with a simpleton after initially being hostile towards him.

Maaveeran was the first in Tamil to be shot in 70 mm film format, and have a six-track stereophonic sound. It was released on 1 November 1986, Diwali day, and became a critical and commercial failure.

Plot

Cast

Production 
Maaveeran is a remake of Manmohan Desai's 1985 Hindi film Mard, and even used some footage from that film. It was shot in the expensive 70 mm film format, becoming the first Tamil film to do so. Sivaji Ganesan was initially attached to star in the film, but later opted out. The film was prominently shot in Mysore, including the Mysore Palace.

Soundtrack 
The music was composed by Ilaiyaraaja. He composed a six-track stereophonic sound, making Maaveeran the first film to achieve this feat.

Release and reception 
Maaveeran was released on 1 November 1986, Diwali day, and faced heavy competition from Punnagai Mannan, Aruvadai Naal and Palaivana Rojakkal. The Indian Express wrote on 7 November 1986, "The film makes its way through sadism and violence, damning sentiment, religion and righteousness by its downright exploitativeness. Its corny cliches are almost sickening". The film emerged a critical and commercial failure; according to Rajinikanth's biographer Naman Ramachandran, the combination of Punnagai Mannans director K. Balachander, lead actor Kamal Haasan, lead actress Revathi and the soundtrack by Ilaiyaraaja "proved too much for Maaveeran, and its audience was restricted to hard-core Rajinikanth fans". Jayamanmadhan of Kalki wrote ."Even though couple of songs are average, the cinematography being an consolation, [..] despite using new techniques for fight scenes [..] Because of a plot which confuses and goes around aimlessly, it has almost become like a vomit after delicious products and pouring so much of money"

References

Bibliography

External links 
 

1980s Tamil-language films
1986 action films
1986 films
Films about revolutions
Films directed by Rajasekhar (director)
Films scored by Ilaiyaraaja
Indian action films
Tamil remakes of Hindi films